Kelfield is a hamlet in North Lincolnshire, England.

 
Kelfield was once the home of Cornelius Vermuyden.

External links

Hamlets in Lincolnshire
Borough of North Lincolnshire